is the ninth live video album by Japanese band Wagakki Band, released on April 23, 2022 by Universal Music Japan in two editions: Blu-ray + CD and Blu-ray + DVD. The video covers the band's annual New Year concert at the Nippon Budokan on January 9, 2022. The concert aired on Wowow Plus on February 27, 2022.

The video peaked at No. 10 on Oricon's Blu-ray chart.

Track listing
All tracks are arranged by Wagakki Band.

Personnel 
 Yuko Suzuhana – vocals
 Machiya – guitar
 Beni Ninagawa – tsugaru shamisen
 Kiyoshi Ibukuro – koto
 Asa – bass
 Daisuke Kaminaga – shakuhachi
 Wasabi – drums
 Kurona – wadaiko

Charts

References

External links 
 
  (Universal Music Japan)

Wagakki Band video albums
2022 video albums
Japanese-language video albums
Universal Music Japan video albums
Albums recorded at the Nippon Budokan